Brian David Jenkins (born 19 September 1942) is a British Labour Party politician who was the Member of Parliament (MP) for Tamworth from 1997 until 2010. From 1996 to 1997, he was MP for South East Staffordshire before minor boundary changes in 1997.

Parliamentary career
Jenkins was elected to the House of Commons at the South East Staffordshire by-election in April 1996, following the death of Conservative Party MP David Lightbown. He had contested the seat in 1992.

The South East Staffordshire constituency was abolished in boundary changes at the 1997 general election, when he was returned to Parliament for the new Tamworth constituency. He was re-elected at the 2001 general election and again in 2005, but lost the seat to the Conservative Party candidate Chris Pincher in 2010.

References

External links
 ePolitix – Brian Jenkins MP official site
 Guardian Unlimited Politics – Ask Aristotle: Brian Jenkins MP
 Brian Jenkins' Page at the Labour Party
 TheyWorkForYou.com – Brian Jenkins MP
 BBC Politics

1942 births
Living people
Alumni of the London School of Economics
Alumni of the University of Wolverhampton
Labour Party (UK) MPs for English constituencies
People from Tamworth, Staffordshire
UK MPs 1992–1997
UK MPs 1997–2001
UK MPs 2001–2005
UK MPs 2005–2010
Mayors of places in Staffordshire